Meelin GAA is a Gaelic Athletic Association club is based in Meelin, Cork, Ireland and is part of the Rockchapel and Meelin parish. The club is affiliated with the Duhallow division of Cork GAA and has both a hurling and a Gaelic football team. Until recently, the club did not have a Gaelic football team within the football area represented by Knockscovane GAA Club, which took part in Duhallow division until its amalgamation with Meelin GAA club. Meelin juvenile footballers play with St. Peter's which is an amalgamation of the Meelin, Freemount and Rockchapel clubs at juvenile level. In 2009 Meelin won the Duhallow Junior A Hurling Championship for the first time in 13 years. In 2010, they followed this up with consecutive titles defeating Kilbrin in 2010. This was the start of the club's resurgence that led them to the All-Ireland Junior Final in Croke Park. Meelin won the final with a final score of 0–12 to 1–5 over John Locke's of Kilkenny.

History
Meelin GAA Club was founded in 1928 and in their early years played competitive hurling in the North Cork (Avondhu) division.  In the 1930s, Meelin began competing in the recently established Duhallow division. In 1939 Meelin won its first Duhallow Junior A Hurling Championship and followed on with three additional victories in 1940, 1941 and 1943. Following the 1943 victory, Meelin waited 27 years to secure their next Duhallow Championship in 1970. This victory, was the first in a new era for the club, subsequently winning a further 15 Duhallow titles. Meelin contested the final of the Cork Junior Hurling Championship in 1973 and 1986 but were defeated by Ballinhassig and Ballymartle. Meelin have won the Duhallow Junior Hurling League on 11 occasions – 1970, 1971, 1975, 1980, 1985, 1986, 1990, 1991, 1995, 2008 and 2010. Following a significant decline in the local population, the club merged with Freemount for juvenile hurling competitions. The merged club is known as St. Mark's.

County Finals
Meelin reached their first ever county junior hurling championship final in 1973 and played against Ballinhassig from the Carrigdhoun division. Meelin was defeated with a score of 1–6 to 0–5 at Coachford. Cork goalkeeper at the time Martin Coleman played in goal for Ballinhassig. In 1986 Meelin returned to the county final, however the club suffered a defeat, losing to Ballymartle, with a score of 3–8 to 2–4, with the game also played at Coachford. The 2010 competition would forever be remembered in the history of Meelin GAA Club, winning the County Junior A Championship. Meelin defeated Cloughduv 1–19 to 2–9 in the County Final at Páirc Uí Rinn, in front of almost 4,000 spectators.

Munster Championship
By virtue of winning the County in Cork, Meelin represented Cork in the Munster Junior Hurling Championship. In the Semi-final Meelin beat Effin of Limerick, at an eagerly contested and well attended game in Kilmallock. St Patricks of Tipperary provided the opposition for the Final in Mallow. A dominant Meelin was triumphant with a score of 5–18 to 0–9, and Meelin were crowned Munster Champions.

All-Ireland journey
The first step on the All-Ireland campaign was at Páirc na hÉireann, Birmingham. Meelin's opposition in the All-Ireland quarter final was the Fullen Gaels club from Manchester. The supporters travelled from far and wide to see 'the Mighty Meelin' play a championship game overseas. Meelin won the game with a score of 2–15 to 0–8, to set up an All-Ireland semi-final against Bearna/Na Forbacha of Galway. The All-Ireland Semi-final was played at Éire Óg, Ennis and Meelin prevailed with a score of 0–16 to 1–4, following a poor performance. This set up a set up a subsequent contest with the Kilkenny club John Lockes on 13 February at Croke Park. Meelin won with a score of 0–12 to 1–5.

All-Ireland Squad

Intermediate

2011
Meelin's first championship encounter at Intermediate level was against Fr. O'Neills. Meelin lost this game after extra time on a scoreline of 4–16 to 2–20. Aghada defeated Meelin in the fourth round of the championship ending their championship season. 2011 Also saw Meelin win Division 3 of the Intermediate League defeating Dripsey in the final. The team qualified for the final with wins over Kanturk, Milford, Cobh, Barryroe, Éire Óg, Blackrock, Dripsey and Dromina along with a draw against Fr.O'Neills. The only defeat of the league campaign was at Meelin's first ever Intermediate game at home against Fermoy. The League victory earned Meelin promotion to Division 2 for the 2012 season.
2012
Meelin's second year at Intermediate level saw them beaten in the County Quarter Final by Argideen Rangers. Meelin had got to the quarter-final by beating Dripsey in the first round and beating Milford in the fourth round. 2012 saw Meelin promoted yet again in the Intermediate League. A draw with Aghada coupled with wins against Kilbrittain, Aghabullogue, Dripsey, Argideen Rangers, Castlelyons and a final day victory over Ballyhea helped Meelin qualify for the final. Defeats in the league were home games to Valley Rovers and Ballygarvan. Ballyhea defeated Meelin in the final however both finalists get promoted, so Meelin played in Division 1 in 2013.
2013
Meelin's third year at Intermediate level saw them knocked out of the championship by Kanturk at the quarter-final stage. Meelin lost the first round to Aghada but regrouped with a win over Aghabullogue in the second round. The fourth round saw Meelin grind out a victory over Argideen Rangers that set up the quarter final encounter with Kanturk. The league saw mixed results with Meelin finishing on 10 points, 5 victories (Cloyne, Ballincollig, Ballyhea, Newcestown, Blarney) and 5 defeats (Tracton, Bandon, Carrigaline, Kilworth, Youghal), enough to preserve Division 1 status for another year.
2014
2014 was another year of mixed results for Meelin on the league and Championship front. Meelin won comfortably in the first round of championship after a good display against Aghabullogue. They then received a bye in the draw to the quarter-final where Aghada were the opposition. Meelin were beaten by Aghada who lost out in the semi-final to county champions Kanturk. The league also brought mixed results with both memorable displays and poor performances. Home wins against Cloyne, Tracton, Castlelyons and away win against Fermoy plus a draw against Premier Intermediate Champions Ballyhea was enough to preserve division 1 status for another year. The defeats in the league campaign were against Bandon, Ballinhassig), Newcestown, Kilworth and Ballincollig.
2015
2015 brought yet another change of management but hit and miss league performances saw the team relegated from Division 1 and lost out to Fr. O'Neills in the Championship 4th Round. Meelin were drawn against Dripsey in the first round and won by 10 points, but went on to lose out in the 4th Round to a last minute goal from O'Neills. The League form was mixed and saw Meelin relegated with 7 points, 3 wins (Bandon, Kilworth, Ballinhassig), 1 draw (Blarney), and 5 defeats (Courcey Rovers, Fermoy, Tracton, Inniscarra, Cloyne). The County Board restructured the championship at the end of 2015 eliminating relegation from all grades and promoting 10 new teams to the Intermediate Hurling grade, this resulted in Meelin preserving Division 1 hurling status as only one team (Bandon) dropped out of the division.
2016
2016 was another year of mixed results for Meelin in both the County League and Intermediate Championship. Meelin were eliminated from the championship at the quarter final stage after a comprehensive defeat to Aghada. The First round saw Meelin record a victory over Ballincollig. This set up a winners section game against Fr. O'Neills for a place in the quarter final. Meelin lost out in a tight game but recorded victories over Grenagh and Blackrock to bring them to the quarter final encounter with Aghada. Meelin were relegated from Division 1 in the County League after a campaign of mixed results. Meelin finished on 7 points, 3 wins (Charleville, Inniscarra, Courcey Rovers), 1 draw (Mallow) and 6 defeats (Ballinhassig, Fermoy, Tracton, Blarney, Cloyne, Kilworth). This relegated Meelin to division 2 for the 2017 season.

Honours
 All-Ireland Junior Club Hurling Championship Winners (1) 2011
 Munster GAA Junior Club Hurling Championship Winners (1) 2010
 Cork Junior Hurling Championship Winners (1) 2010
 Duhallow Junior A Hurling Championship Winners (20) 1939, 1940, 1941, 1943, 1970, 1971, 1972, 1973, 1977, 1980, 1981, 1982, 1986, 1990, 1991, 1993, 1994, 1996, 2009, 2010
 Cork Minor B Hurling Championship Winners (1) 1993
 Cork Junior Football Championship 1918 – Youghal and Meelin qualified for final which was not played
 Duhallow Junior A Hurling League Winners (11) 1970, 1971, 1975, 1980, 1985, 1986, 1990, 1991, 1995, 2008, 2010
 Duhallow Under-21 Hurling Championship Winners (4) 1972, 1973, 2004, 2006
 Duhallow Junior B Hurling Championship Winners (3) 2007, 2008, 2011

Notable players
 Bernie O'Connor

References

Gaelic games clubs in County Cork
Gaelic football clubs in County Cork
Hurling clubs in County Cork